Soyini Asanti Fraser (born 1990) is a Guyanese television host, dancer, model and beauty pageant titleholder, who won Miss Guyana 2016 and represented Guyana at Miss Universe 2016 pageant.

Personal life
Fraser consider herself is an independent, fearless and compassionate individual. She is a senior company member at The Classique Dance Company. She is also one of Guyana's travelling dance companies.

Pageantry

Miss Earth 2010
On 4 December 2010, Soyini represented Guyana at Miss Earth 2010 pageant in Vietnam.

Miss Guyana World 2011
Fraser competed at Miss Guyana World 2011 and placed 1st runner-up.

Miss Princess of the World 2011
Soyini competed in Czech Republic and place Top 9.

Miss UN 2012
In 2012, Fraser competed in Miami, Florida, for Miss UN 2012 and won.  This was her first International title.

Miss Jamzone Guyana 2014
Soyini is the Guyanese Beauty Queen won Miss Jamzone Guyana 2014 Guyana.

Miss Jamzone International 2014
Soyini won Miss Jamzone International 2014 on 15 August 2014, in Georgetown, Guyana.Guyana.

Miss Grand Guyana 2015 & Miss Grand International 2015
Soyini was crowned Miss Grand Guyana 2015 which made her eligible to compete at Miss Grand International 2015 on 25 October 2015, in Thailand.  The Grand Coronation night was held at an indoor stadium – Huamark in Bangkok.  She did not make it to Top 20 on the Grand Coronation night.

Miss Guyana 2016
Soyini also won Miss Guyana 2016 on 17 September 2016, and represented Guyana at Miss Universe 2016 and did not place..

Other competitions
In 2012, Fraser competed in Guyana Top Model Search and placed first runner-up.

References

External links
Missuniverseguyana.org

1990 births
Living people
Miss Universe 2016 contestants
Miss Earth 2010 contestants
Guyanese beauty pageant winners
People from Georgetown, Guyana